Sergei Yuryevich Panov (born June 30, 1970) is a Russian retired professional basketball player. He represented the Russian national basketball team.

Achievements
 Won the 2005/06 EuroLeague with CSKA Moscow 
 won the 1994/95, 1995/96, 1996/97, 1997/98, 1998/99, 1999/00, 2002/03, 2003/04, 2004/05 and 2005/06 Russian Championship CSKA Moscow
 won the 2000/01 and 2001/02 Russian Championship Ural Great Perm 
 won the 2005 and 2006 Russian Cup with CSKA Moscow
 won the 1999/00 NEBL Championship with CSKA Moscow
 won the 2000/01 NEBL Championship with Ural Great Perm
 won the silver medal at the 1993 European Championship 
 won the silver medal at the 1994 and 1998 FIBA World Championship   
 won the bronze medal at the 1997 European Championship

References
Official web site
Euroleague.net Profile
CSKA Moscow official Profile

1970 births
Living people
Russian men's basketball players
PBC CSKA Moscow players
Olympic basketball players of the Unified Team
Olympic basketball players of Russia
Basketball players at the 1992 Summer Olympics
Basketball players at the 2000 Summer Olympics
Small forwards
Sportspeople from Ryazan
BC Spartak Saint Petersburg players
PBC Ural Great players
2002 FIBA World Championship players
1998 FIBA World Championship players
1994 FIBA World Championship players